Chemical & Engineering News (C&EN) is a weekly news magazine published by the American Chemical Society, providing professional and technical news and analysis in the fields of chemistry and chemical engineering. It includes information on recent news and research in these fields, career and employment information, business and industry news, government and policy news, funding in these fields, and special reports. The magazine is available to all members of the American Chemical Society.

History
The magazine was established in 1923, and has been on the internet since 1998.

The editor-in-chief is Bibiana Campos Seijo.

Abstracting and indexing
The magazine is abstracted and indexed in Chemical Abstracts Service, Science Citation Index, and Scopus.

References

External links

American Chemical Society academic journals
Chemical engineering journals
Engineering magazines
Magazines established in 1923
Magazines published in Washington, D.C.
Professional and trade magazines
Science and technology magazines published in the United States
Weekly magazines published in the United States